The Dimitrov Communist Youth Union (DKMS) was the state-sanctioned youth movement in the People's Republic of Bulgaria and an important organ of the Bulgarian Communist Party, which utilized the organization to educate the Bulgarian youth in Marxist-Leninist philosophy and prepare the younger generations for future party membership. It was the parent organization of the Dimitrovist Pioneer Organization "Septemberists", the membership of which was for children between 9 and 14 years of age.

See also
Komsomol
Workers Youth League
Dimitrovist Pioneer Organization "Septemberists"

References

Youth wings of political parties in Bulgaria
Bulgarian Communist Party
Youth organizations established in 1944